Norberto Méndez (born May 25, 1971) is an Argentine sprint canoer who competed in the late 1980s. He was eliminated in the repechages of the K-4 1000 m event at the 1988 Summer Olympics in Seoul.

References
Sports-reference.com profile

1971 births
Argentine male canoeists
Canoeists at the 1988 Summer Olympics
Living people
Olympic canoeists of Argentina
Place of birth missing (living people)